Sutton-in-Ashfield railway station sometimes referred to as "Sutton Town" and "Sutton-in-Ashfield General" was a station on a short branch line from Sutton Junction in Sutton-in-Ashfield, Nottinghamshire, England. It was opened in 1892, and was located off Station Road. The station was located much closer to Sutton-in-Ashfield town centre then its neighbouring Midland stations. Although the nearby Great Northern railway station was located nearby.

History
Opened by the Midland Railway, it became part of the London, Midland and Scottish Railway during the Grouping of 1923. The station then passed on to the London Midland Region of British Railways on nationalisation in 1948, the station survived use until 1956.

Stationmasters
Charles Snell 1894 - 1905 (formerly station master at Sutton Junction)
Robert Herbert 1905 - 1912
Horace Wroughton 1912 - ca. 1917
E.S. French from 1937 (formerly station master at Market Rasen)

The site today

The Robin Hood Line was revived in the 1990s following the closure of the Mansfield Railway through the town and the freight-only route was then reused. The station site has since been demolished and redeveloped as the "Broad Shopping Centre" with hardly any evidence of the railway ever being there.

References

 
 
 Station on navigable O.S. map
 Huthwaite Online - Tracking Stationed Railways

Disused railway stations in Nottinghamshire
Former Midland Railway stations
Railway stations in Great Britain opened in 1892
Railway stations in Great Britain closed in 1956
Sutton-in-Ashfield